The Kent Island Bay Times or simply the Bay Times is a weekly newspaper based in Stevensville, Maryland and is owned by Chesapeake Publishing, the same company that owns The Record Observer in Centreville, Maryland and The Star Democrat in Easton, Maryland, and other newspapers on both sides of the Chesapeake Bay.  It is published every Wednesday and covers news mostly in southern Queen Anne's County including all of Kent Island, Grasonville and Queenstown.

History
The Bay Times was Founded by Christopher J. Rosendale Sr. and his wife Mary Lou in 1963. The first issue of the Bay Times was published in 1963 and covered the assassination of John F. Kennedy. In 1974, Mr. Rosendale on behalf of the Bay Times became the first newspaper editor to gain previously secret information, in this case on non support cases, by suing under the state's Public Information Law, which had been enacted two years earlier. In the early years, The Bay Times was an advocate for volunteer fireman training, school reform and the establishment of Chesapeake College and the Chesterwye Center, a workshop and training facility for developmentally disabled adults gaining Community Service Awards from the Maryland-Delaware-DC Press Association. Mr Rosendale's pictures of the Cambridge Riots won National Awards after publication in the Bay Times. The Rosendales sold the Bay Times in 1974. On June 4, 2008, the newspaper, debuted a new design, and its website also debuted around this time.  As of 2008, it is distributed throughout southern Queen Anne's County and covers local news, as well as state and national news that pertains to Kent Island and the rest of Queen Anne's County.

References

External links
Official website

Kent Island, Maryland
Queen Anne's County, Maryland
Newspapers published in Maryland
Newspapers established in 1963
1963 establishments in Maryland